International Bibliography of Periodical Literature (IBZ: Internationale Bibliographie der Zeitschriftenliteratur) covers the academic journal literature in the humanities, social sciences, and related disciplines. Coverage includes journals from 40 countries and in more than 40 languages. Subject indexing is based on the Subject Headings Authority File (Schlagwortnormdatei) and Name Authority File (Personennormdatei) published by the German National Library. The file size is over 3.3 million records from over 11,000 journals, with 120,000 records added annually..

IBR

IBR represents International Bibliography of Book Reviews of Scholarly Literature in the Humanities and Social Sciences (Internationale Bibliographie der Rezensionen geistes- und sozialwissenschaftlicher Literatur) is a bibliographical database covering scholarly works. It is published by K. G. Saur.

References

Further reading
  Describes the historical development of IBZ, and the methods used to select journal for coverage. Strengths and weaknesses are evaluated and IBZ is compared to other indexes.

External links
 

Bibliographic databases and indexes